Zhernovtsy is a rural locality (a settlement) in Srostinsky Selsoviet, Yegoryevsky District, Altai Krai, Russia. The population was 50 as of 2013.

Geography 
Zhernovtsy is located 28 km northeast of Novoyegoryevskoye (the district's administrative centre) by road. Srosty is the nearest rural locality.

References 

Rural localities in Yegoryevsky District, Altai Krai